The 2004 WNBA season was the eighth for the Phoenix Mercury.

Offseason

WNBA Draft

Regular season
In her WNBA debut, Taurasi netted 26 points and led the Mercury to an 84-76 victory over the Seattle Storm. For the season, the rookie averaged 17.0 points, 4.4 rebounds and 3.9 assists per game. Although the Mercury did not qualify for the playoffs, the season was a personal success as Taurasi was named to the Western Conference All Star team and won the WNBA Rookie of the Year Award.

Season standings

Season Schedule

Player stats
Note: GP= Games played; FG = Field Goals; MIN= Minutes; REB= Rebounds; AST= Assists; STL = Steals; BLK = Blocks; PTS = Points

Awards and honors
Diana Taurasi, WNBA Rookie of the Year Award

References

External links 
Mercury on Basketball Reference

Phoenix Mercury seasons
Phoenix
Phoenix Mercury